Hela Yungst Hochman (January 15, 1950 - February 24, 2002), also known as Hela Young, was an American television entertainer and beauty pageant winner. She was a promoter of Holocaust awareness and a former president of the New Jersey Commission on Holocaust Education.

Yungst was born in Tel Aviv, Israel, to Eva (née Faiman) and Henry; both were survivors of The Holocaust. The family moved to the United States in 1956 where she first lived in Newark, New Jersey. She was raised in Hillside, New Jersey and graduated from Hillside High School in 1967, where she was a member of the National Honor Society. She graduated from Newark State College (now Kean University) with a B.A. in music education and theatre.

Yungst was Miss New Jersey 1970, representing the state in the Miss America 1971 pageant in Atlantic City. The Women's Liberation Front demonstrated at the event. Yungst was not a finalist, however, losing to Miss Texas 1970, Phyllis George. In August 1971, Yungst traveled to Vietnam with George; Miss Nevada 1970, Vicky Jo Todd; Miss New Jersey 1970, Cheryl Browne; Miss Iowa 1970, Karen Shields; Miss Arkansas 1970, Donna Connelly; and Miss Texas 1970 (George's replacement), Belinda Myrick. They participated in a 22-day United Service Organizations tour for American troops there. The tour began in Saigon. Browne later commented that she thought "it was one of the last Miss America groups to go to Vietnam."

Yungst was a performer on stage and in films, television commercials and soap operas, appearing in Guiding Light and All My Children. She changed her name to Hela Young and became the New Jersey Lottery hostess in January 1977 on NJN drawing the nightly winning numbers. She left television in November 2001 due to illness.

She resided with her husband and daughter in Mountainside, New Jersey and died in 2002 due to cancer.

The New Jersey Commission on Holocaust Education presents "The Hela Young Award" each year "to honor a person in recognition of outstanding work in the community for the improvement of human relations among diverse peoples and for the improvement of the human condition."

References

External links
A Tribute to Hela Young - NJN Behind the Scenes, March, 2002

1950 births
2002 deaths
Hillside High School (New Jersey) alumni
Israeli emigrants to the United States
Kean University alumni
Miss America 1971 delegates
People from Edison, New Jersey
People from Hillside, New Jersey
People from Mountainside, New Jersey
People from Newark, New Jersey
Year of birth unknown
20th-century American people